SMSP may refer to:
Saint Michael's School of Padada, school in the Philippines
Società dei Missionari di San Paolo, Eastern Catholic religious order including Pierre Kamel Medawar